Joan Margall i Sastre (born 2 November 1975) is a Spanish politician from Catalonia who serves as Member of the Congress of Deputies of Spain.

Early life
Margall was born on 2 November 1975 in Torroella de Montgrí, Catalonia. He has a degree in history from the University of Girona.

Career
Margall is a business consultant. He is a member of the Catalan National Assembly (ANC). He joined the Republican Left of Catalonia (ERC) in 2017.

At the 1999 local elections Margall was placed 13th on the Unitat i Progrés Municipal (UPM) electoral alliance's list of candidates in Torroella de Montgrí but the alliance only managed to win five seats in the municipality and as a result he failed to get elected. He contested the 2003 local elections as a UPM candidate in Torroella de Montgrí and was elected. He was re-elected at the 2007 local elections. After the election ERC-AM formed an administration with Republican Left of Catalonia-Acord Municipal (ERC-AM) with Margall serving as mayor from 2007 to 2009 and deputy mayor from 2009 to 2011. At the 2011 local elections Margall was placed 13th on the UPM-PM's list of candidates in Torroella de Montgrí but the alliance only managed to win three seats in the municipality and as a result he failed to get re-elected. Margall was vice-president of Baix Empordà County Council from 2003 to 2007.

At the 2015 general election Margall was placed third on the Republican Left of Catalonia–Catalonia Yes (ERC–CatSí) electoral alliance's list of candidates in the Province of Girona but the alliance only managed to win two seats in the province and as a result he failed to get elected. At the 2016 general election hew was placed third on ERC–CatSí's list of candidates in the Province of Girona but the alliance only managed to win two seats in the province and as a result he failed to get elected. However, in June 2018, he was appointed to the Congress of Deputies following the resignation of Teresa Jordà. He was re-elected at the 2019 general election.

Personal life
Margall is married and has two children - Maura and Maiol.

Electoral history

References

External links

1975 births
Independent politicians in Catalonia
Living people
Mayors of places in Catalonia
Members of the 13th Congress of Deputies (Spain)
Municipal councillors in the province of Girona
People from Baix Empordà
Republican Left of Catalonia politicians
University of Girona alumni
Members of the 14th Congress of Deputies (Spain)